Khardong may refer to:

 Kardang, a village in Himachal Pradesh, India
 Khardong Monastery located in Kardang
 Khardong, Leh, a village in Jammu & Kashmir, India; location of Khardung La pass
 Khardong La or Khardung La, mountain pass located near Khardong, Leh